Hacker Time is a British children's sketch comedy talk show, broadcast by CBBC, starring Hacker T. Dog, a character from Scoop. In each episode, Hacker interviews a celebrity, and plays games and the show also includes recurring segments, such as sketches. Six series of the show were produced, which were aired from 2011 to 2016.

Production
In December 2014 it was announced that there would be a fifth series, consisting of ten episodes. It started on 27 July 2015 at 9:00am.

In 2017, it was confirmed that the show would not be returning for a seventh series that year.

Episodes

Series 1 (2011)

Series 4 (2014)

Series 6 (2016)

Segments
Each episode has a distinct format. At the start is a cold open featuring what goes wrong in the studio where the show takes place. There is then a title sequence. Often episodes feature an interview with a celebrity (usually a BBC star). The episodes consist of a fact file, a comedic chat about the star of the show, a fictional commercial break (in some episodes), a song, a specific themed segment (usually in the style of a soap opera), more chatting, a parody of the show the special guest stars in, and another sketch. In four series, the show's final sequence is a game, either 'What's In 'Em?' in series 3, 'Get Out!' in series 4, ‘Sit on the Lav Lav and Answer My Questions’ in series 5, and 'Beam My Guest' in series 6. The show ends a goodbye song, reminding viewers to tune in to the next edition.

In all of the episodes there are many segments. In series 1, one of the recurring extras are a spoof of Downton Abbey called Downstairs Abbey starring Hacker T. Dog and Dodge T. Dog as maids and Ed Petrie as their master. It stars two maids (Hacker the Dog and Dodge the Dog) who are in love with Lord Percy (Ed Petrie) but to their dismay he is in love with another woman Lady Sarah (Isabel Fay). Whenever Lady Sarah comes to the Abbey, Lord Percy tries to do something nice for her involving the maids and it all goes disastrously wrong. Then Lord Percy asks the maids to clear up after him.

There is also the 'Betterer Arena' in which Hacker attempts to perform better than the celebrity/s at their profession, be it acting or sport and then fails spectacularly. This features Warrick Brownlow-Pike as various different assistants for Hacker.

In Series 2 of Hacker Time, The Adventures of Sherlock Bones (a parody of Sherlock Holmes) replaces Downstairs Abbey, in which Hacker goes around the land of Teapot solving mysteries, often making silly conclusions at the end of each episode. Each episode of Sherlock Bones is about 2–4 minutes long.

In Series 2, Derek, one of Hacker's assistants, shows a part of the episode called Derek Time in which he shows three clips, and when Hacker says no he threatens to show the viewers at home "the photograph".

In Series 3, The Adventures Of Sherlock Bones is replaced with the "hard hitting medical docu-drama", "Casually", a spoof of Casualty, in which all the doctors and nurses give the wrong treatment. "Tales of the Mild West" also appears, where Hacker becomes the mayor of an old western town.

In Series 4 the first 5 episodes featured "A Knight's Tale". The last 5 episodes contained "Areoport", a mockumentary set in an airport.

In Series 5 episode 1-5, there was "Ms Marbles Mysteries" (a parody of Miss Marple), where Ms Marbles (played by Hacker) finds many mysteries and solves them. In episodes 6-10 there is "The Next Step But One", a parody of The Next Step. This was replaced in subsequent series by "Lost and Found (And Lost Again)", a parody of The Next Step's spinoff show Lost and Found.

References

External links
 Official website
 
 
 

2010s British children's television series
2011 British television series debuts
2016 British television series endings
BBC children's television shows
British television shows featuring puppetry
English-language television shows
BBC television comedy
British comedy television shows